The 1962 Men's World Weightlifting Championships were held in Budapest, Hungary from September 16 to September 22, 1962.  There were 113 men in action from 27 nations. These world championships were combined with European championships.

Medal summary

Medal table

References
Results (Sport 123)
Weightlifting World Championships Seniors Statistics

External links
International Weightlifting Federation

World Weightlifting Championships
World Weightlifting Championships
International weightlifting competitions hosted by Hungary
World Weightlifting Championships